Colette, also released under the name Prisoner of Auschwitz, is a 2013 English language Czech-Slovak-Dutch war film written and directed by Milan Cieslar and starring Jirí Mádl and . It is set in World War II and based on the Arnošt Lustig book, A girl from Antwerp.

Plot

Cast 
 as Colette
Jirí Mádl as Vili Feld
 as Weissacker
Andrej Hryc as Fritz
Zuzana Mauréry as Broderova
Ondřej Vetchý as Elli
Helena Dvořáková as Kordula
Kristína Svarinská	
Juraj Adamík
Jiří Bartoška as Old Vili (voice)
Dan Brown
Lubomir Burgr
Václav Chalupa
Jan Cina as Jeremiás

Jeremi Durand as François Platard (voice)
Ivan Franěk	
Pavel Gajdoš
Jordan Haj
Robert Holik as Mourning Brother
Juraj Hrcka
Jitka Jackuliak
Anna Kocicová
Barbora Kodetová

Philipp Kraiczy
 as Sowa
Denisa Pfauserová
Elena Podzámska
Kajetán Písarovic
Balcárek Radek
Eva Reiterová
	

Tomas Sotak
Josef Tkác
Miroslav Táborský

See also 
 List of Czech films of the 2010s

References

External links 

2010s war films
Czech war films
English-language Czech films
English-language Dutch films
English-language Slovak films
Slovak war films
Czech World War II films
Dutch World War II films
Slovak World War II films
2010s English-language films